Samuel Johannes Cornelis Dunlop (25 December 1908, in Batavia – 8 June 1977, in Utrecht) was a Dutch bobsledder who competed in the mid-1930s. At the 1936 Winter Olympics in Garmisch-Partenkirchen, he finished tenth in the two-man event.

References

1936 bobsleigh two-man results

1908 births
1977 deaths
Olympic bobsledders of the Netherlands
Bobsledders at the 1936 Winter Olympics
Dutch male bobsledders
People from Batavia, Dutch East Indies